George Kennedy (1925–2016) was an American actor.

George Kennedy may also refer to:

 George Kennedy (businessman) (1799–1870), founder of Georgetown, Ontario, Canada
 George N. Kennedy (1822–1901), New York politician and judge
 George Kennedy (sports promoter) (1881–1921), owner of the Montreal Canadiens ice hockey team, 1910–1921
 George Kennedy (Scottish footballer) (1882–1917), Scottish association footballer who played for Lincoln City and Chelsea
 George A. Kennedy (sinologist) (1901–1960), American professor of Chinese at Yale University, 1938–1960
 George Kennedy (Australian footballer) (1919–1979), Australian rules footballer
 George Kennedy (politician) (1927–2003), Canadian politician, Liberal Member of the Legislative Assembly of Quebec for the district of Châteauguay
 George A. Kennedy (classicist) (born 1928), American classical scholar
 George Clayton Kennedy (1919–1980), American botanist